Borisovskaya is a rural locality (a village) in Verkhnetoyemsky District, Arkhangelsk Oblast, Russia. The population was 58 as of 2010.

Geography 
It is located on the Severnaya Dvina River, 20 km from Verknyaya Toyma.

References 

Rural localities in Verkhnetoyemsky District